Anna Karin Helena Fiske (born 5 September 1964) is a Swedish-born illustrator and writer who settled in Norway.

Fiske was born in Ängelholm, and is married to illustrator Lars Fiske. She was educated at Konstfack in Stockholm, and has resided in Norway since 1994. Among her comics albums are Forvandlingen from 1999, Snakke med dyr from 2002, and Danse på teppet from 2004. She published the comics magazine Rabbel from 2005 to 2009. Her book Hallo Jorda was nominated for the Norwegian Critics Prize in 2007. Her picture book Små og store ting du kan lage selv was awarded two prizes in 2010, and she was awarded Bokkunstprisen in 2014.

Bibliography 
Anna Fiske has published a number of books, including:

 How Do You Make a Baby? (Gecko Press, 2020)

References

1964 births
Living people
People from Ängelholm Municipality
Swedish illustrators
Norwegian illustrators
Swedish emigrants to Norway
Norwegian comics artists
Norwegian comics writers
Norwegian children's writers
Swedish comics artists
Swedish comics writers
Swedish children's writers
Norwegian women illustrators
Swedish women illustrators